Pedro Guerrero may refer to:

Pedro E. Guerrero, photographer
Pedro Guerrero (baseball, born 1956), former Major League Baseball player
Pedro Guerrero (baseball, born 1988), baseball coach
Pedro Guerrero (bishop) (died 1613), Spanish Roman Catholic bishop
Pedro Guerrero (composer), Spanish Renaissance composer
Pedro Oliverio Guerrero, Colombian drug lord

See also
Pedro Guerreiro, Portuguese politician